The year 1727 in music involved some significant events.

Events 
April 11 – Johann Sebastian Bach gives the première of his St Matthew Passion BWV 244b (BC D 3a) at St. Thomas Church, Leipzig
Farinelli performs at Bologna, where he meets his mentor, Antonio Bernacchi.
The Davidov-Morrini, ex General Dupont and Holroyd violins are made by Antonio Stradivari.
Johann Adolph Hasse arrives in Venice.
Louis-Claude Daquin is appointed organist at St Paul's in Paris.
Agostino Steffani visits Italy for the last time, and meets Handel at the palace of Cardinal Ottoboni in Rome.
George Frideric Handel is commissioned to write four anthems for the coronation ceremony of King George II of Great Britain.

Published music 
Joseph Bodin de Boismortier 
6 Suites à 2 Muzettes, Op. 11
6 Concertos for 5 Flutes, Op. 15
6 Suites à 2 Muzettes, Op. 17
André Chéron – Sonates en trio, Op. 1
Azzolino Bernardino Della Ciaia – Harpsichord Sonata in G major, Op. 4
 Girolamo Nicola Laurenti – 6 Concerti, Op. 1
 Michelle Mascitti – 8 Violin Sonatas and 4 Concertos à 6, Op. 7 (Paris)
Antonio Vivaldi – La Cetra (The lyre) (Op. 9), 2 violin concertos and 1 for 2 violins (Amsterdam)
Robert Woodcock – 12 Concertos in 8 parts

Classical music 
Johann Sebastian Bach 
Ach Gott, wie manches Herzeleid, BWV 58
Ein feste Burg ist unser Gott, BWV 80
Ich habe genug, BWV 82, premiered Feb. 2 in Leipzig
Ich bin vergnügt mit meinem Glücke, BWV 84
Ich lasse dich nicht, du segnest mich denn!, BWV 157
Dem Gerechten muss das Licht, BWV 195
Lass, Fürstin, lass noch einen Strahl, BWV 198
Matthäuspassion, BWV 244b
Partita in A minor, BWV 827
 Antonio Caldara – Il Batista
Johann Joseph Fux – Laetare turba
Christoph Graupner – Machet die Tore weit, GWV 1101/27
George Frideric Handel 
Coronation Anthems
Sonatas for an accompanied solo instrument, Op. 1 (published)
Jean-Philippe Rameau – Nouvelles suites de pièces de clavecin
Johan Helmich Roman – 12 Flute Sonatas, BeRI 201–212
Giuseppe Sammartini – 12 Trio Sonatas
Georg Philipp Telemann 
6 Sonatas, TWV 40:101–106
Trio Sonata, TWV 42:e7 (likely)
Jan Dismas Zelenka 
Credidi, ZWV 85
De profundis, ZWV 96
Lauda Jerusalem, ZWV 104
Magnificat, ZWV 107

Opera
Antonio Bioni – Attalo ed Arsinoe
Giovanni Bononcini – Astianatte
George Frideric Handel
Admeto, Premiered Jan. 31 in London
Riccardo Primo
Leonardo Leo – Il Cid
Benedetto Marcello – Arianna
Georg Reutter – Archidamia
Leonardo Vinci – La caduta de' decemviri
Antonio Vivaldi
Farnace (first premiered; this version was lost and the 1731 Pavia version is the only one extant today)
Ipermestra, RV 722
Orlando
Siroe re di Persia, RV 735

Published Theoretical Writings 

 Ernst Gottlieb Baron – Historisch-theoretische und practische Untersuchung des Instruments der Lauten
 Giuseppe Graziani – Continuazione, e supplemento alla drammaturgia di M. L. Allacci

Births 
February 25 – Armand-Louis Couperin, organist, harpsichordist and composer (died 1789)
March 9 – Johann Gottlieb Preller, cantor and composer (died 1786)
March 14 – Johann Gottlieb Goldberg, harpsichordist, organist and composer (died 1756)
March 30 – Tommaso Traetta, composer (died 1779)
April 5 – Pasquale Anfossi, opera composer (died 1797)
April 29 – Jean-Georges Noverre, a founder of modern ballet (died 1810)
October 9 – Johann Wilhelm Hertel
date unknown
Marie Favart, singer, dancer and actress (died 1772)
Rosa Scarlatti, opera singer (died 1775)

Deaths 
February 22 – Francesco Gasparini, composer (born 1661)
May – Daniel Roseingrave, organist and composer (born c. 1655)
August 14 – William Croft, organist and composer (born 1678)
December 1 – Johann Heinrich Buttstett, organist and composer (born 1666)

References

 
18th century in music
Music by year